Academy of Medical Sciences may refer to:

 Academy of Medical Sciences (United Kingdom)
 Chinese Academy of Medical Sciences, Beijing, China
 Iranian Academy of Medical Sciences, Iran
 NRI Academy of Medical Sciences, Andhra Pradesh, India
 SUT Academy of Medical Sciences, Thiruvananthapuram, Kerala, India
 USSR Academy of Medical Sciences
 University of Medical Sciences and Technology, Khartoum, Sudan; also known as the Academy of Medical Sciences and Technology